Ted or Tedd Mitchell may refer to:

 Ted Mitchell (American football) (1905–1985)
 Tedd L. Mitchell (born 1962), American physician and academic
 Ted Mitchell (EastEnders), fictional character

See also
 Edward Mitchell (disambiguation), including Ed Mitchell
 Todd Mitchell (born 1966), American professional basketball player